Foundation and Empire is a science fiction novel by American writer Isaac Asimov originally published by Gnome Press in 1952. It is the second book in the Foundation Series, and the fourth in the in-universe chronology. It takes place in two parts, originally published as separate novellas. The second part, "The Mule," won a Retro Hugo Award in 1996.

Foundation and Empire saw multiple publications—it also appeared in 1955 as Ace Double (but not actually paired with another book) D-125 under the title The Man Who Upset the Universe. The stories comprising this volume were originally published in Astounding Magazine (with different titles) in 1945.  Foundation and Empire was the second book in the Foundation trilogy. Decades later, Asimov wrote two further sequel novels and two prequels. Later writers have added authorized, and unauthorized, tales to the series.

Plot summary

The General

The first half of the book, titled "The General," focuses on General Bel Riose of the Galactic Empire, who governs the planet Siwenna. He comes across myths regarding the Foundation and attempts to confirm them by coercing the aid of a Siwennian named Ducem Barr, whose father Onum met the Foundation trader Hober Mallow decades ago. After further research through visiting Foundation territory Riose determines that they're a threat to the Empire and declares war upon them, both to fulfill his duty to the Empire and satisfy his personal pursuit of glory. Barr is familiar of Hari Seldon's psychohistory and through it is confident of the Foundation's inevitable victory, an assertion Riose repeatedly disputes.

Riose captures and interrogates a Foundation trader named Lathan Devers, who reveals in private to Barr that he allowed himself to be taken in order to disrupt Riose's operation from the inside. Devers is met by Ammel Brodrig, Emperor Cleon II's Privy Secretary who was sent by the Emperor to Riose in order to keep an eye on the general. Devers tries to implicate Riose in an attempt to overthrow Cleon. However, Brodrig betrays Devers to Riose. Barr knocks out Riose before he can subject Devers to more effective interrogation and Devers and Barr escape in the latter's ship. Barr confesses to Devers that he cooperated with Riose in order to prevent the discovery of a planned Siwennian uprising in the event of the Foundation's triumph over Riose.

Devers and Barr head to Trantor in a last ditch attempt at turning Cleon II against Riose by implicating the latter in a conspiracy to overthrow the former with the help of Brodrig. However, in their attempt to bribe their way up the chain of bureaucracy, they are caught in the act by a member of the Secret Police, but managed to flee the planet before they are arrested. During their escape, they intercept news of Bel Riose and Brodrig's recall and subsequent arrest for treason (both are later said to have been executed), which leads to Siwenna's rebellion and the end of the threat to the Foundation.

During the festivities celebrating Siwenna joining the Foundation, Barr explains to Devers and the Foundation's top merchant prince Sennet Forell that the social background of the Empire made the Foundation's victory inevitable regardless of what actions they and Bel Riose took, as only a strong Emperor and a strong general could have threatened the Foundation, but an Emperor is only strong by not allowing strong subjects to thrive, and Bel Riose's success made him into a threat that Cleon II needed to eliminate. With the Empire nearing its end and the Second Foundation not expected to be met until centuries later, the Foundation anticipates no further opposition. However, an internal conflict between the Foundation's merchant princes and the traders is foreshadowed.

The characters of Emperor Cleon II and Bel Riose in this story are based on those of the historical Roman Emperor Justinian I and his general Belisarius. Their story was familiar to Asimov from his recent reading of Robert Graves's novel Count Belisarius, and of his earlier study of Edward Gibbon's History of the Decline and Fall of the Roman Empire, on which the entire series is loosely based.

"The General" was first published in the April 1945 issue of Astounding Science Fiction under the title "Dead Hand."

The Mule

The second half of the book, titled "The Mule," takes place approximately one hundred years after the first half. The Empire, after its final phase of decline and civil war, has ceased to exist, Trantor has suffered "The Great Sack" by a "barbarian fleet," and only a small rump state of 20 agricultural planets remain. Most of galactic civilization has disintegrated into barbaric kingdoms. 

The Foundation has become the dominant power in the galaxy, controlling its territory through its trading network. The outline of the Seldon Plan has become widely known, and Foundationists and many others believe that as it has accurately predicted previous events, the Foundation's formation of a Second Empire is inevitable. The leadership of the Foundation has become dictatorial and complacent, and many outer planets belonging to the Traders plan to revolt.

An external threat arises in the form of a mysterious man known only as the Mule. The Mule (whose real name is never revealed) is a mutant, and possesses the ability to sense and manipulate the emotions of others, usually creating fear and/or total devotion within his victims. He uses this ability to take over the independent systems bordering the Foundation, and has them wage a war against it. In face of this new threat, the provincial Traders join with the central Foundation leaders against the Mule, believing him to be the new Seldon crisis.

As the Mule advances, the Foundation's leaders assume that Seldon predicted this attack, and that the scheduled hologram crisis message appearance of Seldon will again tell them how to win. To their surprise, they learn that Seldon predicted a civil war with the Traders, not the rise of the Mule. The tape suddenly stops as Terminus loses all power in a Mule attack, and the Foundation falls.

Foundation citizens Toran and Bayta Darell, along with the psychologist Ebling Mis and "Magnifico Giganticus," a clown fleeing the Mule's service, travel to different worlds of the Foundation, and finally to the Great Library of Trantor. The Darells and Mis seek to contact the Second Foundation, which they believe will be able to defeat the Mule. They also have suspicions that the Mule wishes to know the location of the Second Foundation as well, so that he can use the First Foundation's technology to destroy it.

At the Great Library, Ebling Mis works continuously until his health fatally deteriorates. As Mis lies dying, he tells Toran, Bayta, and Magnifico that he knows where the Second Foundation is. Before he can reveal the Second Foundation's location, however, Bayta kills him. Bayta had realized, shortly before, that Magnifico was actually the Mule, who had used his powers in every planet they had previously visited. In the same way, he had forced Mis to continue working and find what the Mule was looking for. Bayta had killed Mis to prevent him from revealing the Second Foundation's whereabouts to the Mule.

The Darells are left on Trantor. The Mule leaves to reign over the Foundation and the rest of his new empire. The existence of the Second Foundation, as an organization centered on the science of psychology and mentalics, in contrast to the Foundation's focus on physical sciences, is now known to the Darells and the Mule. Now that the Mule has conquered the Foundation, he stands as the most powerful force in the galaxy, and the Second Foundation is the only threat to his eventual reign over the entire galaxy. The Mule promises that he will find the Second Foundation, while Bayta asserts that it has already prepared for him and thus that he will not have enough time before the Second Foundation reacts.

"The Mule" was first published under that title in the November and December 1945 issues of Astounding Science Fiction.

Reception

Groff Conklin described Foundation and Empire as "fine swashbuckling galactic adventure [based] on some extremely hard-headed, scientific and mature social-political thinking." Boucher and McComas, however, panned the volume, declaring that "Anyone with a nodding acquaintance with Gibbon, Breasted, or Prescott will find no new concepts [here] save the utterly incomprehensible ones contained in the author's own personal science of 'psycho-history'."

In 1996 "The Mule" was retrospectively awarded a Hugo Award for best novel of 1945. The Foundation trilogy, of which Foundation and Empire is the second book, won a Hugo Award in 1966 for Best All-Time Series.

The Visi-Sonor inspired the Holophonor, a similar instrument that appears several times in the cartoon Futurama.

Characters

"The General" or "Dead Hand" 
 Bel Riose, the last strong general who attempted to capture the Foundation.
 Ducem Barr, a Siwennian patrician, the only surviving son of Onum Barr, and a hostage of Riose.
 Lathan Devers, a trader sent to spy on Riose.
 Cleon II, the last strong emperor before "The Great Sack" of Trantor.
 Ammel Brodrig, Cleon II's Privy Secretary.

"The Mule" 
 The Mule, a mutant who captures the Foundation and attempts to establish a Second Empire.
 Magnifico Giganticus, a fictitious identity assumed by the Mule to disguise himself and approach the unsuspecting Toran and Bayta Darell in Kalgan. Magnifico purports to be the former clown of the Mule, having escaped from his master.
 Toran and Bayta Darell, Husband and wife, Bayta a former citizen of The Foundation, Toran a trader of the periphery planet of Haven.
 Captain Han Pritcher, an intelligence agent for the Foundation, and the first to recognise the power of the Mule.
 Mayor Indbur III, Mayor of the Foundation during the Mule's conquest.
 Ebling Mis, the psychologist who discovered the location of the Second Foundation.
 Dagobert IX, one of the last emperors on Neotrantor.

Sequels
The sequel, Second Foundation, tells the rest of the Mule's story. 
In the fourth book in the series, Foundation's Edge, Asimov writes that the Mule had been a rogue member of the planet/society Gaia.
The demise of the Empire's remnant on Trantor is told in "Trantor Falls" by Harry Turtledove in Foundation's Friends, a tribute collection.

References

Sources

External links 
 
 
 "Dead Hand" and "The Mule" parts one and two on the Internet Archive

1952 American novels
1952 science fiction novels
Foundation universe books
American science fiction novels
Science fiction novels by Isaac Asimov
Hugo Award for Best Novel-winning works
Works originally published in Analog Science Fiction and Fact
Books with cover art by Don Ivan Punchatz
Fiction about memory erasure and alteration
Gnome Press books

sv:Stiftelseserien#Stiftelsen och imperiet